Iwan Benito Marvin Redan (born 21 August 1980), better known as Iwan Redan, is a Dutch footballer who plays as a striker.

Club career

2000–2004: The beginnings 
Born in Rotterdam, Redan started his career via amateur clubs Germinal and Neptunus in the Sparta Rotterdam youth squads. He signed his first professional contract with Vitesse Arnhem instead but was hired on loan by RBC Roosendaal, playing in the Eerste Divisie where he made his professional debut in a match against Excelsior Rotterdam on 5 March 2000 by replacing Miodrag Božović in the 62nd minute. Eventually he played nine matches and scores two goals before he moved to RKC Waalwijk where he made his Eredivisie debut. He became a first team regular, and was called up into the Dutch under-21 team. However, a long term injury forced him to miss the whole 2001/02 season and most of the 2002/03 season.

After recovering he returned playing, but was no longer a first team regular at RKC and as a result he was sent on loan to Roda JC. As Yannis Anastasiou was leaving Roda JC at the end of the season the club wanted to sign Redan from RKC, but he was called back as the current RKC striker Rick Hoogendorp was also expected to leave. Hoogendorp eventually stayed and Redan was not used in the first period of the 2004/05 season and then moved to Willem II where he signed a 3-year deal.

2004–2007: Willem II and rise to fame 
At Willem II he became one of the team's key players and almost represented the team in all of their league games. However, in late December 2005 he and Dutch international player Kevin Bobson were relegated to Willem II's second team because their mental and physical performances were considered to be weak. As a result, Redan wanted to leave the club and went on trial to several clubs like Preston North End, Sheffield Wednesday, Ipswich Town and CD Numancia, but did never sign a contract and returned to Willem II. Since then he hardly played any matches until he became a regular again in the 2006/07 season and even became the team's captain. Willem II was however performing badly and was found in the lower rankings of the league all the time. During a KNVB Cup match against De Graafschap Redan headbutted team mate Kristof Imschoot and the Willem II board decided Redan had to leave the club.

2007–: downfall 
Redan was not sold, but found himself on loan to Cardiff City FC. He failed to establish himself in the squad and at the end of the season he returned to Willem II but was released by the club at the end of the year. He had a trial for Aris Thessaloniki F.C. but he did not persuade the head coach Dusan Bajevic.

Statistics

References

External links

Vi.nl profile
Redan movie at Willem II website

1980 births
Living people
Footballers from Rotterdam
Dutch sportspeople of Surinamese descent
Dutch footballers
SBV Vitesse players
RBC Roosendaal players
RKC Waalwijk players
Roda JC Kerkrade players
Willem II (football club) players
Cardiff City F.C. players
Sparta Rotterdam players
Almere City FC players
Eredivisie players
Eerste Divisie players
Dutch expatriate footballers
Expatriate footballers in Wales
Dutch expatriate sportspeople in Wales
Excelsior Rotterdam players
Association football forwards